The Abraham Lincoln, also known as Denver and Rio Grande Western Railroad Business Car No. 101, is the oldest operable passenger car in the United States allowed to run on tracks operated by Amtrak. It is listed on the National Register of Historic Places.

Construction and revenue use 
The new technology of the time was electric lighting, so the new cars required the addition of electrical wiring, switches, switchboards, generators, and batteries. Wood and steel trucks were replaced with massive structural steel castings.

It was September of this year that coach 895 was manufactured for the Western Pacific Railroad (WP) at an original cost of $13,624.50 (equivalent to $ in ). The car was configured as an 84-seat coach and was the culmination of the most modern design and construction of heavyweight steel cars from the Pullman Company.  Pullman passenger cars such as the WP 895 were the ultimate in travel prior to World War I.

On January 11, 1924, coach 895 became Denver and Rio Grande Railroad (D&RG) number 926. At that time, its book value was given at $8,783.90 (equivalent to $ in ). In 1929, the railroad car was rebuilt by the D&RG in their Burnham shops, Denver, Colorado, to a self-contained private railroad car for the president of the Denver and Rio Grande Western Railroad (D&RGW). Numbered D&RG 101, it was complete with staterooms, office, bathrooms, observation room, kitchen, dining room, and porter's compartment. At this time, the 101 was refitted with six-wheel trucks (estimated book value of $580.65). The (used) 1910 trucks were from one of the three buffet-library cars originally built for the Western Pacific, which were renumbered 981, 982, and 984 in 1915-16. These buffet-library cars were moved to a lower service as D&RGW baggage cars 741, 742, and 744, and their six-wheel trucks replaced with two-axle trucks in 1929. Four of these trucks are the ones that found their way to the D&RG Car 101 and its sister car, the 102. The rebuild cost $33,294.22 (equivalent to $ in ) in December 1929 is when it received its present design and floor plan. At , the D&RG Business Car 101 was the pride and status symbol of the powerful and elite in the business world, but within two weeks of its unveiling, the stock market crash of 1929 brought reality back into perspective.

The 101 was built and initially assigned to the president of the D&RGW and is a unique example of rail cars at the turn of the century. It has survived almost a hundred years as a rare example of "state of the art" 1910 railroad technology. The interior was distinguished by its hand crafted satin walnut lightly accented with bronze hardware and richly tailored fabrics.

Retirement and restoration 
In September 1964, the car was retired and sold to Golden West Rail Tours. At this time, it had a book value of $47,659.60 (equivalent to $ in ), and accrued depreciation of $44,409.60 (equivalent to $ in ), for a net value of $3,250 (equivalent to $ in ). The car was later sold for scrap value.

In 1983 the car was purchased by Mr. Curtis Andrews and transported from Los Angeles to Tucson, Arizona, for eight months of mechanical rebuilding to make it certified for Amtrak use. The mechanical restoration included purchase and installation of newer (1945) trucks to replace the three-axle 1910 trucks which had been installed in the 1929 upgrade. These newer style integral cast trucks were once used under a US Army hospital car. The car also received a new brake system for its six axles and a 45-page engineering analysis. After rebuilding in Arizona, the car traveled to Spokane, Washington, via Amtrak and the final leg from Spokane to Bruce, Washington, a railroad siding and industrial site just east of Othello. The tradition of numbering this class of railroad cars had changed to giving the cars names, so this car was renamed the Abraham Lincoln.  The Abraham Lincoln antiquated elegance is not only rare, but it is also the oldest operational car in America allowed on tracks run by Amtrak. While one of only a handful of heavyweight steel Pullman Cars left in the United States, this attests to the knowledge of the early steel engineers, the attitude to make something last, and the desire for quality.

This car is named in honor of President Abraham Lincoln and should not be confused with the first private car in America, which was built for President Lincoln as a means to unite the nation after the civil war. Lincoln's private car was used for his funeral train in 1865, leaving Washington on April 21, 1865, and arriving in Springfield, Illinois, on May 3. Lincoln's funeral car was destroyed by fire in 1911 shortly after this car (as the Western Pacific coach 895) went into service. Quite by coincidence, the D&RG 101 had been built 101 years after President Lincoln was born.

The extensive restoration of the Abraham Lincoln has returned it to the simple elegance of the 1920s. In July 1988, the Abraham Lincoln was listed on the National Register of Historic Places, which records the tangible reminders of the history of the United States and is the official list of the nation's cultural resources worthy of preservation.

See also 
 Messenger of Peace Chapel Car, Snoqualmie, Washington
 National Register of Historic Places listings in Adams County, Washington

References

External links

The Abraham Lincoln 1910 Heavyweight Pullman Business Car
Listing of railway cars and locomotives on the National Register of Historic Places
Photo gallery in Ozark Mountain Railcars website

Rail passenger cars of the United States
Rail transportation on the National Register of Historic Places in Washington (state)
Railway vehicles on the National Register of Historic Places
Denver and Rio Grande Western Railroad
Pullman Company
National Register of Historic Places in Adams County, Washington
Transportation in Adams County, Washington
Western Pacific Railroad
Private railroad cars